Marcelino de Jesus López Soza (born January 1, 1975) is a Nicaraguan former swimmer, who specialized in long-distance freestyle events. Lopez qualified for the men's 400 m freestyle at the 2000 Summer Olympics in Sydney, by receiving a Universality place from FINA, in an entry time of 4:14.43. He challenged five other swimmers in heat one, including Singapore's two-time Olympian Sng Ju Wei. Lopez rounded out a small field to last place in 4:18.89, more than four seconds off his entry time. Lopez failed to reach the top 8 final, as he placed forty-sixth overall on the first day of prelims.

References

1975 births
Living people
Nicaraguan male freestyle swimmers
Olympic swimmers of Nicaragua
Swimmers at the 2000 Summer Olympics
Sportspeople from Managua